Chen Qiannan (born March 19, 1998, in Tianjin, China) is a Chinese singer and actress, and member of Chinese idol group SNH48's Team NII and a former member of BEJ48's Team E.

Career

SNH48 and BEJ48
On January 18, 2016, Chen became a 6th-generation member of SNH48, and on April 20, she was transferred to BEJ48's Team E. On April 29, she made her first public performance as a member of BEJ48 during Team E's first stage, "Pajama Drive".   

On July 29, 2017, during SNH48's fourth General Election, Chen came in 15th within BEJ48, becoming part of BEJ48's Top 16. 
On July 28, 2018, during SNH48's fifth General Election, Chen came in 37th in SNH48 Group and in 6th within BEJ48.

On July 27, 2019, during SNH48's sixth General Election,  Chen came in 48th in SNH48 Group and in 10th within BEJ48.

On August 5, 2020, during SNH48's seventh General Election, Chen came in 37th in SNH48 Group and in 6th within BEJ48

On September 4, 2020, Chen was transferred to SNH48's Team NII due to the temporary disbandment of BEJ48.

Produce Camp 2020
In 2020, Chen joined Chinese competition variety show series Chuang 2020 (also known as Produce Camp 2020) as a contestant. Her rankings in order of episode were: 19th, 21st, 34th, 26th, 25th, 19th, 24th, until she was eliminated on episode 9 in 25th place overall.

Discography

With SNH48

Albums

EPs

With BEJ48

EPs

Filmography

Films

TV series

Stage Units

BEJ48

SNH48

References

External links
 Official Member Profile 
 

1998 births
Living people
BEJ48 members
SNH48 members
Singers from Tianjin